Robert Bowyer (1758–1834) was a British painter.

Robert Bowyer may also refer to:

Robert Bowyer (died 1551/1552), MP for Chichester
Robert Bowyer (died 1576), MP for Reading
Robert Bowyer II (by 1529–1568/68), MP for Chichester in 1555 and 1558/9
Robert Bowyer (diarist) ( 1560–1621),  English politician